The Theater Erfurt is a German municipal theatre located in Erfurt, the capital of Thuringia. The main stage is in a building in the Brühlervorstadt, completed in 2003. The theatre offers musical theatre and concerts, played by the Philharmonisches Orchester Erfurt. Ballet and plays are offered by guest performances. The company organizes the annual open air festival DomStufen. The theatre's current Generalintendant, Guy Montavon, has held the post since 2002.

Stages
The main venue is in a new house, Großes Haus. The large hall seats 840 visitors, a Studio 200 visitors, which can be reduces as Salon im Studio for events for up to 100 people. The courtyard holds the stage Theatrium. Events can also be held in the rehearsal hall for the orchestra. The festival DomStufen takes place on the Domplatz (Cathedral Square) of Erfurt, seating up to 2000 spectators. The company also holds events at the Rathaus (Town Hall) and the Thomaskirche.

Premieres
Montavon has initiated a program of one premiere per season, including:

Revivals 
Another focus of the program are revivals of forgotten operas, including:

General Music Directors (Generalmusikdirektoren)
 Balduin Zimmermann (1894–1904)
  (1905)
 Camillo Hildebrand (1909–1910)
 Paul Wolff (1911)
 Toni Hoff (1912)
 Paul Weißleder (1913)
 Richard Fitsch (1915–1919)
 Gustav Großmann (1920–1923)
 Franz Jung (1924–1952)
  (1953–1956)
 Walter König (1957)
  (1958–1988)
  (1989–1999)
  (2000–2012)
 Joana Mallwitz (2014–2018)
 Myron Michailidis (2018–2022)
 Alexander Prior (2022–present)

In 2014, Joana Mallwitz was the first woman conductor named to the post of Generalmusikdirektorin (GMD) in the institution's history and at the time of her advent to the post, the youngest GMD of a German opera house. She concluded her Erfurt tenure at the close of the 2017-2018 season.  

The current interim GMD of the company is Myron Michailidis, since 2018.  Michailidis is scheduled to stand down as GMD in 2022.  In July 2021, the company announced the appointment of Alexander Prior as its next GMD, effective with the 2022-2023 season.

Discography
 Das Käthchen von Heilbronn, Karl Reinthaler, label: cpo
 Der leuchtende Fluss, Johanna Doderer, label: Quinton
 Nana, Manfred Gurlitt, label: capriccio

References

External links

 
 Erfurter DomStufen-Festspiele
 Theatergesellschaft Erfurt

Buildings and structures in Erfurt
Theatres in Germany